Bell Bay may refer to:
Bell Bay, Great Cumbrae
Bell Bay, Tasmania
Bell Bay (Antarctica)